The Soari River is a river in Papua New Guinea. It is located in Western Province, in the southwest of the country, 500 km west of Port Moresby.

See also 
Soari River languages

References 

Rivers of Papua New Guinea